Flávio Rogério Ribeiro, sometimes known as just Flávio (born December 22, 1976 in Siqueira Campos) is a Brazilian former professional footballer who last played for Puebla of the Primera División de México. He is a Mexican naturalized citizen.

Honors

Club
 Monterrey 
 '''Primera División de México, Clausura 2003,

References

External links
 
Profile at BDFA

1976 births
Living people
Brazilian footballers
Coritiba Foot Ball Club players
C.F. Monterrey players
Dorados de Sinaloa footballers
Tigres UANL footballers
Club Tijuana footballers
Club Puebla players
Liga MX players
Brazilian emigrants to Mexico
Naturalized citizens of Mexico
Association football defenders